Mehdi Noorbakhsh is an Iranian academic and political activist affiliated with the Freedom Movement of Iran.

He is a professor of international affairs & business at Harrisburg University of Science and Technology, having previously taught at the Center for International Studies at the University of St. Thomas in Houston and worked at Harvard University's Center for Middle Eastern Studies as a postdoctoral fellow. Noorbakhsh is vice president of World Affairs Councils of America's chapter in Harrisburg, Pennsylvania.

He is not able to return to Iran for his political activities, as well as public comments.

Early life and education 
Noorbakhsh was born in Iran and immigrated to the United States sometime in the 1970s. He is married to Sarah, a physician and daughter of Ebrahim Yazdi. He obtained a government and international affairs PhD from University of Texas at Austin in 1996.

Views 
A The Patriot-News editorial published in 2010 described him as "Muslim moderate". Noorbakhsh assumes that by seeking rationality within Islam, it can be practiced as a "progressive" faith, while a religious regime of despotic nature would exploit individual spirituality in that society.
He had criticized Jyllands-Posten for 2005 cartoons depicting Muhammad due to "selective targeting" of "the very sanctity of the Muslim faith", and alleged that American policymakers should avoid confrontation with the Muslim world.

Published works

References

External links 
 Profile at Harrisburg University of Science and Technology
 Profile at World Affairs Councils of America

1954 births
Living people
Freedom Movement of Iran politicians
Iranian emigrants to the United States
Iranian expatriate academics
University of Houston alumni
University of Texas at Austin alumni
Harvard University people
Muslim activists